Jack Eugene Wilson (born December 29, 1977) is an American baseball coach and former professional shortstop in Major League Baseball. He is currently an assistant coach at Grand Canyon University.

Early career
Wilson played high school baseball for Thousand Oaks High School in Thousand Oaks, California. He later played for two seasons at Oxnard Junior College, the same baseball program that produced major leaguers Terry Pendleton, Josh Towers, Paul McAnulty, among others. He was coached by Pat Woods, Jon Larsen, Roger Frash and Buster Staniland.

Professional career

St. Louis Cardinals

Pittsburgh Pirates
He made his major league debut a year later.

2004 season
He posted a .308 average, shared the league lead in triples with 12 (along with Jimmy Rollins), scored 82 runs, hit 41 doubles with 11 home runs and 49 RBI, and collected 201 hits (3rd in the league) in 157 games, including 56 multi-hit games. To cap it off he ended the year with a season-high 12-game hitting streak (17-for-46, .370). After hitting eighth in the batting order for most of his career, he became a fixture in the second slot.

With his 201 hits, Wilson became just the ninth National League shortstop to collect 200 hits in a season; the franchise's first player since Dave Parker, and the first Pirates shortstop since Hall of Famer Honus Wagner. Wilson also became the first Pirates player to collect 10 or more doubles, triples and home runs in the same season since Andy Van Slyke.

Defensively, Wilson led National League shortstops in assists (492), putouts (234), and total chances (743); his 129 double plays led all major league shortstops and broke the club record of 128 — set by Gene Alley in  — and went 31 straight contests without making an error. Wilson was named for the 2004 All-Star Game and won the Silver Slugger at shortstop. He was also the Pirates' representative in the Roberto Clemente Award balloting.

2005 season
In December 2004, Wilson was hospitalized for an appendectomy. Despite the setback, he was optimistic at spring training . At 6-foot, 175-pound, Wilson had regained six of the 15 pounds he lost. However, he started the season poorly, hitting just .163 in April and .227 for the first half of the season, and acknowledged that he had not been fully recovered when the season started. Late season improvements to his hitting brought his cumulative season numbers to near his career averages, but still well below the standards he had set in 2004. He finished the year with a .257 batting average, a .299 on-base percentage, and a .363 slugging percentage, compared to his career highs of .308, .335, and .459 respectively the year before.

His defense, however, did not seem to suffer. For the second straight year he led all shortstops in the National League (and, in fact, all of baseball) in assists (523), total chances (783), and double plays (126). Largely because of Wilson and fellow defensive standout second baseman José Castillo, the Pirates turned more double plays in 2005 than any National League team save the Cardinals.

2006–2009
Wilson rebounded offensively yet never to the same level as in 2004.  Most notably, in 2007, he hit .296 with a career high 12 home runs despite only playing in 135 games.  He had frequently been the subject of trade rumors.

Seattle Mariners

2009 season
On July 29, 2009, Wilson was traded to the Seattle Mariners along with Ian Snell for Ronny Cedeño and Minor League players Jeff Clement, Aaron Pribanic, Brett Lorin, and Nate Adcock. Wilson was reportedly shocked to find out he had been traded to Seattle saying, 

He won a Fielding Bible Award for his defensive excellence at shortstop during the season.

In November 2009, Jack Wilson re-signed with the Seattle Mariners for 2-years, $10 million.

Atlanta Braves

2011 season

On August 31, 2011, Wilson was traded to the Atlanta Braves for a player to be named later.
On January 13, 2012, the Braves announced they re-signed him to a 1-year 1M plus 500K bonuses for games played.

On August 31, 2012, the Braves released Wilson.

Retirement
Wilson announced his retirement on September 25, 2012.

Coaching career 
Wilson was the head coach at his alma mater, Thousand Oaks High School, from 2017 to 2021 where he went 98-30-1.

He has held several positions coaching national amateur talent with USA Baseball.

Wilson was named the hitting coach for the Mankato MoonDogs for the 2021 season.

Wilson was named an assistant coach at Grand Canyon University on July 10, 2022, under new Lopes head coach Gregg Wallis.

Personal 
Jack married his wife Julie in 1999. The couple has three children: Jacob, Jaidyn Faith and Jersi Grace.

Jacob plays baseball at Grand Canyon and was a 2022 Golden Spikes Award semifinalist and a member of the USA Baseball Collegiate National Team.

See also

 List of Major League Baseball annual triples leaders

References

External links

1977 births
Living people
Pittsburgh Pirates players
Seattle Mariners players
Atlanta Braves players
Baseball players from California
Major League Baseball second basemen
Major League Baseball shortstops
National League All-Stars
People from Westlake Village, California
Johnson City Cardinals players
Oxnard Condors baseball players
Peoria Chiefs players
Potomac Cannons players
Arkansas Travelers players
Altoona Curve players
Nashville Sounds players
Indianapolis Indians players
West Tennessee Diamond Jaxx players
Tacoma Rainiers players
Gwinnett Braves players
Silver Slugger Award winners
Sportspeople from Ventura County, California
Grand Canyon Antelopes baseball coaches